Andrew Joseph Collins III (born September 7, 1983) is an American politician who is a member of the Arkansas House of Representatives representing the 35th district in Pulaski County. Collins is a member of the Democratic Party.

Political career

Elections
Collins won the Democratic nomination for State Representative on May 22, 2018, defeating Annie Depper, 69 percent to 31 percent.

He was elected in the general election on November 6, 2018, winning 60 percent of the vote over 38 percent for Republican nominee Judith Goodson and 2 percent for Libertarian William J. Barger.

Collins was unopposed for re-election in 2020.

References

Collins, Andrew
Living people
21st-century American politicians
1983 births